Anne Judith Weyman OBE (born 1 February 1943) is a British executive. She was Chief Executive of the Family Planning Association, 1996–2008; and is a Member of the General Medical Council. She is a trustee of the Galapagos Conservation Trust and vice-chair of Britain for Europe, a group campaigning for continued UK membership of the European Union.

Biography 
Weyman was born 1 February 1943 to Stanley Weyman and Rose Weyman. She married Christopher Leonard Bulford in 1977. The following year, she was elected to Westminster City Council, representing the Little Venice ward as a Labour councillor. She did not contest her seat at the 1982 election. Her hobbies include gardening, theatre, music, table tennis and opera.

Honours 
 OBE in 2000 for services to family planning.
 Honorary Doctor of Laws (LLD) from Bristol University in 2005 for contribution to Human Rights and especially Women's Rights.

Selected bibliography

References

External links 
 

1943 births
Living people
Officers of the Order of the British Empire
Labour Party (UK) councillors
Councillors in the City of Westminster